Charaxes larseni is a butterfly in the family Nymphalidae. It is found in Ethiopia. The habitat consists of thornveld savanna.

References

Butterflies described in 1982
larseni
Endemic fauna of Ethiopia
Butterflies of Africa